Bloomfield Township is the name of some places in the U.S. state of Pennsylvania:
Bloomfield Township, Bedford County, Pennsylvania
Bloomfield Township, Crawford County, Pennsylvania

Pennsylvania township disambiguation pages